The former Second Church of Christ, Scientist, located at 655 Cedar Avenue, in Long Beach, California, is an historic structure that on April 1, 2005, was added to the National Register of Historic Places. It is now the Second Samoan Church.

National register listing
Second Church of Christ Scientist (added 2005 - Building - #05000212)
Also known as Second Samoan Congregational Church
655 Cedar Ave., Long Beach
Historic Significance: 	Architecture/Engineering
Architect, builder, or engineer: 	Shields, Fisher and Lake
Architectural Style: 	Classical Revival
Area of Significance: 	Architecture
Period of Significance: 	1900-1924
Owner: 	Private
Historic Function: 	Education
Historic Sub-function: 	School
Current Function: 	Education
Current Sub-function: 	School

See also
 List of City of Long Beach Historic Landmarks
List of Registered Historic Places in Los Angeles County, California
List of former Christian Science churches, societies and buildings
Second Church of Christ, Scientist (disambiguation)
 First Church of Christ, Scientist (Long Beach, California)

References

External links
National Register listing: Second Church of Christ, Scientist
 Second Samoan Church website
 City of Long Beach landmark listing for Second Church of Christ, Scientist

Christian Science churches in California
Church of Christ, Scientist
Long Beach
Churches completed in 1924
Churches on the National Register of Historic Places in California
Buildings and structures on the National Register of Historic Places in Los Angeles County, California
1924 establishments in California